This is a list of notable people from the U.S. city of Sacramento, California.

Artists

Acting, television and filmmaking

 Max Baer, Jr. – actor, director, The Beverly Hillbillies
 Adrienne Barbeau (born and raised) – actress
 Barbi Benton (raised) – model, Playboy Playmate
 Amanda Blake (resident) – actress, Gunsmoke
 Matt Braly (born and raised) – creator of Amphibia
 Scott Brazil (born and raised) – producer, Hill Street Blues, The Shield
 LeVar Burton (raised) – actor, Star Trek: The Next Generation
 Timothy Busfield (resident) – actor, producer, director 
 Jessica Chastain (raised) – Oscar-winning actress
 Ray Collins – actor, Citizen Kane, Perry Mason
 Richard G. Ditlevsen Jr. – stunt performer, television producer
 Ann Doran – actress in Rebel Without A Cause
 Channing Dungey (born and raised) – producer, president of ABC Entertainment Group
 Merrin Dungey (born and raised) – actress
 Sam Elliott (born) – Golden Globe and Emmy-nominated actor
 Holly Fields – voice actress in Shrek franchise
 Jack Gallagher (resident) – comedian
 Greta Gerwig – Academy Award-nominated actress and filmmaker
 Mark Goodson (born) – television producer
 Colin Hanks (born and raised) – actor
 Henry Hathaway (born) – Oscar-nominated director
 Gabrielle Haugh (born and raised) – actress
 Daniel Humbarger (resident) – stand-up comedian
 Jabbawockeez – dance crew (members Phil Tayag, Joe Larot and Kevin Brewer)
 Sam J. Jones – actor, Flash Gordon, Ted
 Chris Kelly (born and raised) – writer, director, producer
 Marlene Kos, video artist
 Brie Larson – Oscar-winning actress
 Larry Linville (raised) – actor of M*A*S*H
 Mr. Lobo – television personality, horror host
 Eric Lynch (resident) – member of the Wack Pack 
 Randolph Mantooth (born) – actor
 Pat Morita (former resident) – Oscar-nominated actor
 Eddie Murphy – Oscar-nominated actor and comedian
 Anthony Padilla – comedian of Smosh
 Brian Posehn (born and raised) – comedian
 Keith Powers (born and raised) – actor
 Kelly Pryce – stand-up comedian 
 Molly Ringwald (born and raised in greater area) – actress, jazz singer
 Scott Schwartz – actor
 Betsy Sodaro – actress, comedian
 Eric Sheffer Stevens – actor
 Sab Shimono (born and raised) – actor
 Samantha Smith – actress, Supernatural
 Brenda Song (raised) – actress
 Johnny Taylor, Jr. – stand-up comedian
 Timothy Thatcher – professional wrestler
 Danielle Moné Truitt – actress
 Mia Tyler – actress
 Mills Watson – actor
 Bob Wilkins – television personality
 Victor Wong (resident) – actor
 John Lloyd Young (born) – Tony-winning actor
 Waleed Zuaiter (born) – actor and producer

Broadcasting and journalism

 Mark S. Allen (resident) – television personality
 Stan Atkinson (resident) – television journalist
 Herb Caen – newspaper columnist
 Morton Downey Jr. – radio-television personality
 Bob Fouts – sportscaster
 John Gibson – media host
 Johnny Hyde - disc jockey.  Host of The Gear Show during the British Invasion
 Don Imus (career originated) – radio personality
 Mitchell Landsberg (born) – journalist
 Rush Limbaugh (career originated, former resident) – radio personality
 Lisa Ling – television personality
 Joan Lunden (attended CSUS, career originated) – television personality
 Jeff Serr – radio personality, voice actor
 Rene Syler (raised, CSUS graduate) – host of The Early Show

Music

 !!! – band
 Lynn Anderson – country singer
 Anton Barbeau – singer-songwriter
 Creed Bratton - actor, most famous as himself on The Office, original lead guitarist of The Grassroots
 Brotha Lynch Hung – rapper
 Blackalicious (originated) – hip-hop duo 
 Brent Bourgeois – singer-songwriter
 Robert Brookins – member of Earth, Wind & Fire
 C-Bo – rapper
 CAKE – alternative rock band
 Geoffrey Carter – composer, musician, producer, and engineer
 Cause & Effect – electronica/synthpop band
 Craig Chaquico – Jefferson Starship guitarist
 Cimorelli – sibling pop group
 Club Nouveau – R&B group
 Doris Coley – singer with The Shirelles
 Johnny Colla – musician
 The Cramps – band
 Dance Gavin Dance – rock band
 Nataly Dawn - singer-songerwriter and half of the musical duo Pomplamoose
 David de Berry – composer
 Death Grips – experimental hip–hop group
 Dedekind Cut – experimental music artist
 Deftones – alternative metal band 
 Vince DiFiore – trumpet, keyboard player for Cake
 DRS – hip hop/R&B
 El Hefe – guitarist for NOFX
 Endeverafter – band
 Far – band
 Frank French – drummer
 Mark Curry Singer, Songwriter – 
 Suzi Gardner – founder of the band L7
 Kevin Gilbert – singer-songwriter
 Margaret Glaspy – singer-songwriter
 Jackie Greene – singer-songwriter, blues guitarist
 Lee Greenwood – country music artist
 Groovie Ghoulies – punk rock band
 Michael Hedges – guitarist
 Hella – band
 Hippie Sabotage – electronic duo
 David Hodo – singer in Village People 
 Hoods – hardcore band
 James House – country music artist, songwriter
 Hobo Johnson – singer, rapper
 Dick Jurgens – swing music bandleader from the 30s & 40s
 King Never – progressive rock band
 Mary Love – R&B singer
 Richard Maloof – musician
 Mandisa – singer
 Marvaless – rapper
 Scott Mathews – record producer, percussionist
 Tim McCord – musician
 John McCrea – singer, guitar player for Cake
 Rose Melberg – musician
 Middle Class Rut – punk band
 Victoria Monet – singer
 Mozzy – rapper
 Gabe Nelson – bassist for Cake
 Oleander – alternative rock band
 OMB Peezy - rapper
 Charlie Peacock – singer, songwriter, record producer
 Gregory Porter – jazz singer
 Rufus Reid – jazz bassist, educator, and composer
 Cynthia Robinson – trumpeter and vocalist for Sly and the Family Stone
 Michael Roe – singer
 Saweetie – rapper
 Sage The Gemini – rapper
 Timothy B. Schmit – bassist and vocalist for the country/rock bands Poco and the Eagles
 Kevin Seconds – musician
 Kevin Sharp – country music singer
 Dawn Silva – singer
 Jimmy Smith – jazz legend dubbed "King of the Hammond B–3 Organ"
 Spiral Starecase
 Will Swan – guitarist
 Steel Breeze – rock band
 T-Nutty – rapper
 Tesla – rock band
 Tycho – electronic musician
 Michael Urbano – drummer
 Jeff Watson – musician
 Chelsea Wolfe – singer-songwriter
 X-Raided Loc – rapper
 Mary Youngblood – flutist

Writing

 Ann Bannon – pulp fiction author
 Deborah Blum – Pulitzer Prize-winning journalist and author
 Dale Brown – adventure–suspense novelist
 Jim Burke – English teacher and author of books on teaching
 Herb Caen – legendary and longtime columnist for the San Francisco Chronicle
 Biba Caggiano – cookbook author, restaurateur
 Raymond Carver – short–story writer, lived in Sacramento, set several works there
 John D. Cox – author of general–audience books about weather, storms, meteorology
 Pete Dexter (resident) – novelist, journalist
 Joan Didion (born and raised) – author, journalist, screenwriter
 William Everson – aka Brother Antoninus, poet
 Eric Hansen – travel writer
 Richard Hellesen – playwright 
 Bob Devin Jones – playwright 
 Karen Kijewski – mystery novelist
 Philip Levine – poet
 Dale Maharidge – Pulitzer Prize-winning author
 Jose Montoya – Chicano poet, Sacramento Poet Laureate
 Reneau Z. Peurifoy – author of self–help books
 Richard Rodriguez – essayist
 Dennis Schmitz – Sacramento Poet Laureate
 Nicholas Sparks (former resident) – novelist
 Lincoln Steffens – investigative journalist, muckraker
 Spencer Stone – Air Force veteran, co-author The 15:17 to Paris
 Anthony Swofford – novelist and Marine veteran
 Mark Twain – novelist and humorist
 William T. Vollmann – National Book Award-winning author and journalist

Other

 Robert Dawson – photographer
 Richard Staples Dodge – illustrator
 Ray Kaiser Eames – designer
 Harry Fonseca – artist
 David Garibaldi (resident) – performance artist
 Ralph Goings – artist
 Rudolf Hess – German Expressionist painter and art critic
 {{ Frank Lameira (special events)
 Tim Ocel – opera and theater director
 May O'Donnell – modern dancer
 Mel Ramos – artist
 Nia Sanchez – 2014 Miss USA
 Dominic Sandoval – dancer
 Fritz Scholder – Native American artist
 Wayne Thiebaud – artist, professor
 Adrian Tomine – cartoonist, illustrator

Athletes

Baseball

Active

 Daniel Descalso – infielder for Chicago Cubs
 Andy Fox – third baseman and hitting coach for Jackson Generals 
 Preston Guilmet – pitcher for Toronto Blue Jays
 David Hernandez – pitcher for Tecolotes de los Dos Laredos
 Rhys Hoskins – first baseman for the Philadelphia Phillies
 J.P. Howell – pitcher for San Rafael Pacifics
 Aaron Judge - outfielder for New York Yankees 
 Manny Parra – pitcher for Leones de Yucatán
 Max Stassi – catcher for Los Angeles Angels
 Rowdy Tellez – first baseman/DH, Milwaukee Brewers 
 Logan Webb – pitcher for San Francisco Giants

Inactive

 Dusty Baker – outfielder, three-time manager of the year
 Jim Barr – pitcher for San Francisco Giants and Los Angeles Angels
 Cuno Barragan – catcher for Chicago Cubs
 Jeff Blauser – shortstop, 1995 World Series champion
 Dan Boitano – pitcher with four MLB teams
 Chris Bosio – pitcher with Milwaukee Brewers and Seattle Mariners
 Larry Bowa – shortstop, five-time All-Star, manager, Philadelphia Phillies coach
 John Bowker – outfielder and first baseman
 Dallas Braden – pitcher, Oakland Athletics perfect game on May 9, 2010
 Bobby Clark – outfielder, California Angels, Milwaukee Brewers
 Royce Clayton – infielder for 11 MLB teams
 Doug Davis – pitcher
 Jermaine Dye – right fielder, MVP of 2005 World Series
 Bob Elliott – infielder and outfielder, seven-time All-Star and manager
 Bob Forsch – pitcher, 1982 World Series champion
 Ken Forsch – pitcher, two-time All-Star
 Stan Hack – infielder, five-time All-Star
 Doug Henry – pitcher for five teams
 Steve Holm – catcher
 Jay Hughes – pitcher for Los Angeles Dodgers
 Joe Inglett – infielder
 Dion James – outfielder
 Geoff Jenkins – outfielder with Milwaukee Brewers
 Nick Johnson – MLB infielder
 Nippy Jones – Milwaukee Braves pinch hitter involved in “the shoe polish incident” in the 1957 World Series
 Spider Jorgensen – Brooklyn Dodgers, NY Giants scout
 Brandon League – pitcher for Los Angeles Dodgers
 Derrek Lee – infielder, 2003 World Series champion
 Randy Lerch – pitcher for four teams
 Brad Lidge – pitcher, 2008 World Series champion
 Mike Lincoln – pitcher
 Mike Marjama – catcher 
 Jerry Manuel – infielder, manager of New York Mets and Chicago White Sox, TV analyst
 Buck Martinez – catcher, manager and sportscaster
 Ryan Mattheus – pitcher 
 Mark McLemore – pitcher for Houston Astros
 John McNamara – manager
 Marc Newfield – outfielder for Seattle Mariners, San Diego Padres, and Milwaukee Brewers
 Rowland Office – outfielder
 Darren Oliver – pitcher
 Dustin Pedroia – second baseman for Boston Red Sox
 Geno Petralli – catcher
 Jeremy Powell – pitcher
 Jerry Royster – third baseman, manager of Las Vegas 51s
 Dick Ruthven – pitcher, 1980 World Series champion
 F.P. Santangelo – player, sportscaster
 Steve Sax – All–Star second baseman, two-time World Series champion
 Bud Stewart – outfielder
 Mike Thomas – pitcher
 Greg Vaughn – All–Star outfielder
 Randy Veres – pitcher for five teams
 Fernando Viña – infielder for five teams
 John Vukovich – infielder for three teams; manager of Chicago Cubs and Philadelphia Phillies
 Matt Walbeck – catcher
 Wally Westlake – utility player, National League All-Star 
 Vance Worley – pitcher
 Charlie Zink – pitcher for Boston Red Sox

Basketball

 David Ancrum (born 1958) – basketball player, top scorer in the 1994 Israel Basketball Premier League
 Ryan Anderson – Miami Heat forward
 Matt Barnes – former NBA forward
 Keita Bates-Diop – NBA small forward with Denver Nuggets
 Ruthie Bolton – former WNBA player
 Bill Cartwright – NBA center who played for three teams and won three championships
 Marquese Chriss – NBA Power Forward
 David Cooke – one–year NBA forward with the Sacramento Kings
 James Donaldson – former NBA center
 Jim Eakins – former NBA/ABA center
 Darnell Hillman – former NBA and ABA forward
 Mel Hutchins – former NBA forward
 Ike Iroegbu (born 1995) – American-born Nigerian basketball player for Hapoel Galil Elyon of the Israeli Basketball Premier League
 Kevin Johnson – NBA guard for Phoenix Suns, Mayor of Sacramento
 Joel Jones – Puerto Rican national basketball team
 Jim Loscutoff – former NBA forward
 Rich Manning – former NBA forward
 DeMarcus Nelson – former NBA and Duke guard, attended Sheldon High School
 Michael Stewart – former NBA center who played for five teams
 Bobby Jackson – former NBA guard, coach of Stockton Kings
 René Rougeau (born 1986) – basketball player for Maccabi Haifa of the Israeli Basketball Premier League
 Don Verlin – men's basketball coach at the University of Idaho
 D.J. Wilson – Milwaukee Bucks forward

Boxing

 Max Baer – former world heavyweight boxing champion
 Diego Corrales – former world lightweight and junior lightweight boxing champion
 Loreto Garza – super lightweight world champion
 Willie Jorrin – former Super Bantamweight champion
 Juan Lazcano – light welterweight boxer
 Tony Lopez – former world super featherweight and lightweight boxing champion
 Pete Ranzany – welterweight boxer

Football

Active (NFL)

 Arik Armstead – defensive end for San Francisco 49ers
 Clancy Barone – tight ends coach for San Diego Chargers
 Devante Bond – linebacker for Chicago Bears
Devontae Booker - running back for New York Giants
 Jarrett Bush – backup defensive back for Green Bay Packers
 James Campen – offensive line coach for Green Bay Packers
 Vince Mayle – receiver for Dallas Cowboys
 Terrance Mitchell – backup cornerback for Chicago Bears
 Eric Pinkins – defensive back for Seattle Seahawks
 Phil Snow – defensive coach in Division 1A and NFL 
 Shaq Thompson – linebacker for Carolina Panthers
 Jordan Kunaszyk – linebacker for Washington Football Team
 Ross Dwelley - Tight End for San Francisco 49ers
 Ian Book - Quarterback for Philadelphia Eagles

Arena Football League and Canadian Football League

 Dek Bake – defensive tackle for Saskatchewan Roughriders 
 Marko Cavka – offensive lineman for Hamilton Tiger-Cats 
 Bobby Dawson – defensive back in Canadian Football League
 Eddie Elder – defensive back for Ottawa Redblacks 
 Aaron Garcia – quarterback for New York Dragons 
 Etu Molden – wide receiver/defensive back for Chicago Rush 
 Ricky Ray – quarterback for Toronto Argonauts 
 Charles Roberts – running back for BC Lions 
 Isaiah Ross – offensive lineman for Nashville Kats 
 Damen Wheeler – defensive back for Los Angeles Avengers

Inactive

 Robert Awalt – tight end
 Justin Bannan – defensive tackle for Baltimore Ravens
 Matt Bouza – wide receiver for San Francisco 49ers and Indianapolis Colts
 Jim Breech – placekicker for Oakland Raiders and Cincinnati Bengals
 Lance Briggs – linebacker for Chicago Bears, seven-time Pro Bowl selection
 Tedy Bruschi – linebacker, won three Super Bowls with New England Patriots
 Dan Bunz – linebacker won two Super Bowls with San Francisco 49ers
 Donald Butler – linebacker for San Diego Chargers
 Giovanni Carmazzi – quarterback, third–round draft pick by San Francisco 49ers
 Rae Carruth – NFL wide receiver found guilty of conspiracy to commit murder of girlfriend
 Kevin Clark – Denver Broncos cornerback, appeared in two Super Bowls
 Erik Coleman – safety for Atlanta Falcons
 Rick Cunningham – lineman
 Ralph DeLoach – football player
 Don Doll – Pro Bowl defensive back
 Alex Van Dyke – wide receiver for New York Jets and Philadelphia Eagles, two-time All-American in college
 Daniel Fells – tight end for Tampa Bay Buccaneers
 Mike Flanagan – center for Houston Texans
 Malcom Floyd – backup wide receiver for San Diego Chargers
 Malcolm Floyd – wide receiver for Houston/Tennessee Oilers and St. Louis Rams
 Scott Galbraith – tight end
 Leland Glass – wide receiver
 Harold Green – running back
 Rodney Hannah – tight end for Dallas Cowboys
 Spencer Havner – linebacker for Green Bay Packers
 Gary Hoffman – defensive back
 Adam Jennings – wide receiver for Detroit Lions
 Charles Mann – defensive tackle for Washington Redskins
 Trevor Matich – lineman
 Marcus McCauley – defensive back for Minnesota Vikings
 Bill Munson – quarterback
 Darrin Nelson – running back
 Ken O'Brien – quarterback for New York Jets and Philadelphia Eagles
 Chris Oldham – defensive back
 J. T. O'Sullivan – quarterback for Cincinnati Bengals
 Mike Patterson – defensive tackle for the Philadelphia Eagles
 Lonie Paxton – long snapper for New England Patriots
 James Phelan – player, coach in College Football Hall of Fame 
 Eason Ramson – tight end
 Tom Rehder – lineman for Super Bowl champion New York Giants
 Ricky Reynolds – defensive tackle
 Don Rogers – safety for Cleveland Browns
 Reggie Rogers – defensive end for Detroit Lions
 Ken Rose – linebacker
 Adrian Ross – linebacker for Cincinnati Bengals and Pittsburgh Steelers
 Ephraim Salaam – offensive tackle for Houston Texans
 Jason Sehorn – cornerback for New York Giants and St. Louis Rams
 Onterrio Smith – running back for Minnesota Vikings and CFL's Winnipeg Blue Bombers
 Donté Stallworth – wide receiver for Cleveland Browns
 Sammie Stroughter – wide receiver for Tampa Bay Buccaneers
 Syd'Quan Thompson – cornerback
 C. J. Wallace – safety for Seattle Seahawks
 Seneca Wallace – quarterback for Cleveland Browns
 Paris Warren – wide receiver for Tampa Bay Buccaneers
 Austin Wentworth – guard for Minnesota Vikings
 Gerald Willhite – running back for Denver Broncos
 D.J. Williams – linebacker for Denver Broncos

Golf

 Brad Bell – PGA Tour and European Tour golfer
 Cameron Champ – PGA Tour golfer
 Natalie Gulbis – LPGA golfer
 Brian Henninger – PGA Tour golfer
 Tom Johnson – PGA Tour golfer
 Spencer Levin – PGA Tour golfer
 Bob Lunn – PGA Tour golfer
 Scott McCarron – PGA Tour golfer
 Kevin Sutherland – PGA Tour golfer
 Nick Watney – PGA Tour golfer

Martial arts

 Urijah Faber – professional mixed martial arts fighter in the UFC and former WEC featherweight champion
 Tyson Griffin – professional mixed martial arts fighter in the UFC
 James Irvin – professional mixed martial arts fighter in the UFC
 Chad Mendes – professional mixed martial arts fighter in the UFC
 Scott Smith – professional mixed martial arts fighter in the UFC
 David Terrell – professional mixed martial arts fighter in the UFC
 Christian Wellisch – professional mixed martial arts fighter in the UFC

Olympians

 Evelyn Ashford – five–time track medalist in 100–meter and 4 × 100 m relay at five Olympic Games
 Ruthie Bolton – women's basketball 1996 and 2000 Olympic gold medalist
 Ben Nighthorse Campbell – captain of the judo team at 1964 Summer Olympics
 Kim Conley – distance runner at 2012 and 2016 Summer Olympics
 Malachi Davis – ran in 400–meter and 4x100-meter relay at 2000 Summer Olympics for the United Kingdom
 Gabriel Gardner – opposite hitter for U.S. volleyball team at 2008 Summer Olympics
 Kate Grace – mid-distance runner at 2016 Summer Olympics
 Eric Heiden – five-time gold medalist speed skater
 Sheila Hudson – finished 10th in triple jump at 1996 Summer Olympics
 Tommy Kono – three–time medalist in weightlifting, 1952, 1956, 1960
 Brian Lewis – gold medalist in 4x100–meter relay at 2000 Summer Olympics
 Lauren McFall – bronze medalist as part of the synchronized swimming team at 2004 Summer Olympics
 Debbie Meyer – three–time Olympic gold medalist swimmer at 1968 Summer Olympics
 Derek Miles – finished seventh in pole vault at 2004 Summer Olympics
 Billy Mills – gold medalist, track, in the 10,000 meters at the 1964 Tokyo Summer Olympics
 Jamie Nieto – finished fourth in high jump at 2004 Summer Olympics
 Leonard "Harvey" Nitz – 1984 cycling silver and bronze medalist, four-time Olympian
 Roger "Jack" Parker – bronze medalist in decathlon at 1936 Berlin Olympics
 Susan Pedersen – swimming gold medalist in 1968 Summer Olympics
 Miguel Ángel Ponce – gold medal winner, soccer, 2012 Summer Olympics
 Vladimir Sabich – finished fifth in the slalom at 1968 Winter Olympics
 Summer Sanders – gold medalist swimmer at 1992 Summer Olympics and broadcaster
 George Schroth – swimmer, bronze medalist in 1924 Olympics
 Mark Spitz – seven-time gold medalist swimmer
 George Stanich – bronze medalist in high jump at 1948 Summer Olympics
 Michael Stember – middle-distance runner at 2000 Summer Olympics
 Chloe Sutton – member of 2008 Summer Olympics United States women's swim team
 Casey Weathers – member of 2008 Summer Olympics United States baseball team
 Mary Whipple – silver medalist in women's eight rowing at 2004 Summer Olympics

Soccer

 Miguel Aguilar – defender for D.C. United
 D.J. Countess – goalkeeper for the Chile club Provincial Osorno
 Steve Cronin – goalkeeper for D.C. United of Major League Soccer
 Kevin Goldthwaite – defender for Portland Timbers of Major League Soccer
 Taylor Graham – defender for Seattle Sounders FC of Major League Soccer
 Ryan Hollingshead – midfielder/defender FC Dallas of Major League Soccer
 Patrick Ianni – defender for U.S. team at 2008 Summer Olympics and Seattle Sounders FC of Major League Soccer
 Adam Jahn – striker / midfielder on under–18 United States men's national soccer team
 Amobi Okugo – midfielder on the under–20 United States men's national soccer team
 Miguel Ángel Ponce – defender for Chivas, on Mexico's national football team 2014
 Tommy Thompson – forward San Jose Earthquakes of Major League Soccer
 Mark White – goalkeeper who played professionally in the Allsvenskan

Other

 Marcus Arroyo – head coach for UNLV Rebels football
 Randall Bal – member of the United States men's swim team
 Cameron Beaubier – motorcycle racer
 Shadrack Kiptoo Biwott – marathoner
 Jeremy Buendia – four-time Olympia men's physique champion
 Scott Burnett – darts player
 Sally Edwards – triathlete
 Vic Grimes – professional wrestler
 Joey Hand – racer, American Le Mans Series and Grand–Am
 Alex Honnold – big wall free solo climber
 Kyle Larson – professional racer, NASCAR driver
 Scott Pruett – racer (NASCAR, Champ Car, IMSA GT, Trans Am and Grand–Am)
 Kort Schubert – former national team member and blindside flanker for USA Rugby
 Louis Stanfill – national team member and blindside flanker for USA Rugby
 Delano Thomas – member of the United States men's volleyball team
 Sam Warburg – tennis player
 Blaine Scully – former fullback and national team captain of USA Rugby
 Solo Sikoa - professional wrestler

Business

 Scott Boras – sports agent, former minor league baseball player
 Darrell Corti – James Beard Award winning grocer
 Charles Frederick Crocker – vice president of Southern Pacific Transportation Company 
 George Crocker – vice president of Southern Pacific Transportation Company
 William Henry Crocker – president of Crocker National Bank
 David Emerson Root – Director, Sacramento Occupational Medical Group
 Mark Hopkins Jr. – co-founder of Central Pacific Railroad
 Charles R. Schwab (born) – founder of Charles Schwab Corporation
 Russ Solomon – founder of Tower Records
 Leland Stanford – co-founder of Central Pacific Railroad, founder of Stanford University, Governor
 Angelo Tsakopoulos – real estate developer

Government and civics

 Xavier Becerra – Attorney General of California and current United States Secretary of Health and Human Services
 John Bigler – Governor of California, Ambassador to Chile
 Betsy Butler - member of the California State Assembly
 Nathaniel Colley – first African American male lawyer in Sacramento
 Ward Connerly – founder of American Civil Rights Institute
 Edwin B. Crocker – California Supreme Court Justice, founder of Crocker Art Museum
 Roger Dickinson – California State Assemblyman
 Tani Cantil-Sakauye – Chief Justice of California
 Grove L. Johnson – United States Representative
 Hiram Johnson – Governor of California, United States Senator
 J. Neely Johnson – Governor of California
 Dave Jones – California Insurance Commissioner
 Charles West Kendall – United States Representative
 Anthony Kennedy – U.S. Supreme Court Justice
 Bill Kennemer – Oregon State Senator
 Eleni Kounalakis – Lieutenant Governor of California
 Herman "Ace" Lawson, Sacramento city councilman, pilot with the Tuskegee Airmen
 Goodwin Liu – California Supreme Court Justice
 Doris Matsui – Member of the U.S. House of Representatives
 Robert Matsui – Member of the U.S. House of Representatives
 Kevin McCarty – Member of California State Assembly
 Austin Quinn-Davidson – Mayor of Anchorage, Alaska
 Joe Serna Jr. – professor, Mayor of Sacramento
 Darrell Steinberg – Mayor of Sacramento

Military
John F. Madden, U.S. Army brigadier general

Academics and science 

 Richard O. Buckius – professor, COO of the National Science Foundation
 Christina Hulbe – Antarctic researcher, glaciologist
 Harvey Itano – biochemist, medical researcher at Caltech, UC San Diego
 Bennet Omalu – forensic pathologist, professor at UC Davis School of Medicine
 Michelle Rhee – teacher, education administrator
 Mary Tsukamoto – educator, cultural historian, and civil rights activist
 Cornel West – philosopher, professor, author

 Richard Lee - professor at University of Hawaii at Hilo

Crime 

Michael Avenatti – convicted of wire fraud and aggravated identity theft
Richard Chase – serial killer, cannibal, necrophile, and mass murderer
Gerald and Charlene Gallego – serial killers
Warren Jeffs – former church president and convicted sex offender
Roger Kibbe – serial killer 
Theresa Knorr – child murderer and torturer
Dorothea Puente – serial killer known for burying boarders in backyard
Morris Solomon Jr. – serial killer
Nikolay Soltys – spree killer of six family members

References

Sacramento, California
Sacramento